Ethereality is the second studio album by the American bi-lingual indie rock band Winter, released on April 6, 2018. It's the band's first release in three years, following their debut album, Supreme Blue Dream, in 2015.

Background 

The album was announced by Winter through social media on February 18. Even though the track listing wasn't revealed straight after the announcement, the name of the tracks could be seen on the album's official artwork.

The long-delayed tracks "Alligator" and "Zoey" are included on the album's track listing. While "Alligator" was revealed to the audience on mid-2013 through a demo version, "Zoey" was written in 2016 and has been performed live ever since.

Previously released singles "Jaded", "Dreaming", "Memória Colorida", "Wherever You Are" and "All the Things You Do", all of which have had moderated commercial success, didn't make it to the final cut of the album.

Track listing

Personnel

Winter
Samira Winter – vocals and guitar
Matt Hogan – guitars and backing vocals
David Yorr – guitar, bass, synth, and backing vocals 
Garren Orr – drums and percussion
Justine Brown – backing vocals
Chelsea Brown – backing vocals

Production
Drew Fischer – engineer
Nolan Eley – Mixer
Matt Hogan – Additional mixing and engineering
Josh Bonati – Mastering

References 

2018 albums
Samira Winter albums